Gunna Kalan is a village located in district of Sialkot, Pakistan. This village is also has a Railway Station. It's a well populated village than all nearer villages. People are well educated. Materic education is available in this village for both girls and boy Govt hight school boys.

References

Villages in Sialkot District